Thomas Dunstan may refer to:
 Thomas Dunstan (Australian politician), member of the Queensland Legislative Assembly
 Thomas Dunstan (water polo), American water polo player
 Thomas B. Dunstan, American politician in Michigan